Hilyer is a surname. It may refer to:

 Amanda Gray Hilyer (1870–1957), African American entrepreneur, pharmacist, civic worker, and civil rights activist
 Andrew F. Hilyer (1858–1925), American  lawyer, businessman, real estate investor, activist and inventor
 Mamie Hilyer (1863–1916), African American pianist